Boudewijn Seapark is a marine mammal park and theme park located in Sint-Michiels, Bruges, Belgium.

Dolphins

In 2020, the park have 8 bottlenose dolphins : Puck (F-53 years old), Linda (F-43 years old), Roxanne (F-34 years old), Yotta (F-21 years old), Indy (F-16 years old), Kite (M-14 years old), Moana (F-4 years old) and Ori (M-4 years old).

External links

Animal theme parks
Amusement parks in Belgium
Buildings and structures in West Flanders
Tourist attractions in West Flanders
Oceanaria
Aspro Parks attractions